Mindless is a 2006 Estonian comedy film directed by Elmo Nüganen and starring Rain Simmul. It tells the story of a 40-year-old businessman who moves to the countryside. It is based on the play with the same name by Jaan Tätte.

The film was made in the summer of 2006. It was released in Estonian cinemas on 5 October 2006.

Cast
 Rain Simmul as Toomas
 Mari-Liis Lill as Girl
 Anne Reemann as Anu
 Indrek Taalmaa as Peeter
 Aivar Tommingas as Vorsti-Jüri
 Peeter Tammearu as Meinart
 Kalju Orro as Uugu
 Helene Vannari as Leida
 Arvo Raimo as Eedu
 Rein Oja as Rommi
 Taavi Eelmaa as Miku
 Kalju Komissarov as Rural municipality mayor
 Märt Avandi as Real estate agent
 Kristel Elling as Silvia
 Sulev Teppart as Defender

References

External links
 Official website 

2006 comedy films
2006 films
Estonian-language films
Films directed by Elmo Nüganen
Estonian comedy films